Supervivientes 2016: Perdidos en Honduras, is the eleventh season of the show Supervivientes and the fifteenth season of Survivor to air in Spain and it was broadcast on Telecinco in 2016. Jorge Javier Vázquez was the main host at the central studio in Madrid, with Lara Álvarez co-hosting from the island, and Sandra Barneda hosting a side debate of the program. For this year the first two contestants, Cristian Nieto and Mª Carmen Torrecillas, were selected in Pasaporte a la isla.

Finishing order

Nominations

External links
http://www.telecinco.es/supervivientes/

Survivor Spain seasons